With a Twist may refer to:

 A twist, a type of cocktail garnish
With a Twist (Todd Rundgren album)
With a Twist (Straight No Chaser album)
With a Twist, album by Alison Limerick 1994